Ruahei Demant (born 21 April 1995) is a New Zealand rugby union player. She made her debut for the New Zealand national women's team, the Black Ferns, against Australia in 2018. A utility back, Demant plays as a first five-eighth, second five-eighth or centre. She was named 2022 World Rugby player of the year.

Career 
Demant has had three knee reconstructions since she made her debut for the Auckland Storm in 2013. In 2019, she was selected for the Barbarians team to play against Wales.

Demant played for the Blues against the Chiefs in the first-ever women's Super Rugby match in New Zealand on 1 May 2021. On 3 November 2021, She was named in the Blues squad for the inaugural Super Rugby Aupiki competition. She was named in the Blues starting line up for their first game against Matatū, they won 21–10. She also started in their 0–35 thrashing by the Chiefs Manawa in the final round.

Demant was selected for the Black Ferns squad for the 2022 Pacific Four Series. She was named as captain for the series. She was named in the squad for the August test series against Australia for the Laurie O'Reilly Cup. She made the Black Ferns 32-player squad for the 2021 Rugby World Cup. New Zealand won the World Cup, and Demant was named the player of the match of the final.

Personal life 
Demant attended Mahurangi College in Warkworth. She is a lawyer by profession. Her younger sister Kiritapu is also in the Black Ferns, having made her debut in 2015. At the 2022 World Rugby Awards she was named Women's 15s Player of the Year.

References

External links 
 Black Ferns profile
 Blues profile

1995 births
Living people
New Zealand women's international rugby union players
New Zealand female rugby union players
Rugby union fly-halves
Rugby union centres
People educated at Mahurangi College